Gosela is a genus of flowering plants belonging to the family Scrophulariaceae.

Its native range is South African Republic.

Species:
 Gosela eckloniana Choisy

References

Scrophulariaceae
Scrophulariaceae genera
Taxa named by Jacques Denys Choisy